Rodrigo Fabián Araya Moreno (born 8 October 1972) is a Chilean former professional footballer who played as a midfielder for clubs in Indonesia.

Career
Born in Santiago, Chile, Araya came to Indonesia in 1994 and began his career with Persma Manado, where he coincided with his compatriots Juan Rodríguez Rubio and Nelson León Sánchez.

Then he moved to Arema Malang, where he is considered a historical player and captain and coincided with his compatriots Juan and Francisco Rodríguez Rubio, sons of Juan Rodríguez Vega. They are well remembered by the club fans.

He also played for Persijatim Jakarta Timur, PSM Makassar, Persema Malang and Persibom Kotamobagu.

Personal life
Araya married Indonesian Yanti Manossoh and made his home in Jakarta. They have two children and the first of them was born in Malang.

References

External links
 Rodrigo Araya at FootballDatabase.eu
 Rodrigo Araya at WeAremania.net 

1972 births
Living people
Footballers from Santiago
Chilean footballers
Chilean expatriate footballers
Persma Manado players
Arema F.C. players
Sriwijaya F.C. players
PSM Makassar players
Persema Malang players
Persibom Bolaang Mongondow players
Indonesian Premier Division players
Chilean expatriate sportspeople in Indonesia
Expatriate footballers in Indonesia
Association football midfielders